Kingston was a federal electoral district represented in the House of Commons of Canada from 1867 to 1925 and from 1953 to 1968. It was located in the province of Ontario. It was created by the British North America Act of 1867, and initially consisted of the city of Kingston, Ontario. In 1903, it was expanded to include the village of Portsmouth.

The electoral district was abolished in 1924 when it was redistributed into Kingston City riding.

In 1952, a new Kingston riding was created from Kingston City and parts of Frontenac—Addington ridings. It consisted of the city of Kingston and the townships of Pittsburg, Storrington, Kingston, Howe Island, and Wolfe Island (including Simcoe Island, Horse Shoe Island, and Mud Island) in the county of Frontenac.

The electoral district was abolished in 1966 when it was redistributed between Frontenac—Lennox and Addington and Kingston and the Islands ridings.

Members of Parliament

This riding elected the following members of the House of Commons of Canada:

Election results

1867–1925

1953–1968

See also 

 List of Canadian federal electoral districts
 Past Canadian electoral districts

External links 
Riding history 1867-1925 from the Library of Parliament
Riding history 1952-1968 from the Library of Parliament

Former federal electoral districts of Ontario
Kingston, Ontario